Arthur Ross may refer to:

Arthur Wellington Ross (1846–1901), Canadian politician, educator and lawyer
Arthur Ross (bishop) (1869–1923), Anglican bishop in Ireland
Arthur Edward Ross (1870–1952), Canadian politician
Arthur Ross (cricketer) (1872–?), Irish cricketer
Arthur Ross (baseball) (1878–1916), American baseball player
Art Ross (1885–1964), Canadian ice hockey player and General Manager of the Boston Bruins, 1924–1953
J. Arthur Ross (1893–1958), Manitoba politician
Arthur Dwight Ross (1907–1981), World War II RCAF pilot and George Cross recipient
Arthur Ross (philanthropist) (1910–2007), American businessman and philanthropist
Arthur A. Ross (1920–2008), American screenwriter
Arthur "T-Boy" Ross (1949–1996), songwriter, recording artist and brother of recording artist Diana Ross

See also
Arthur Rose (1634–1704), Religious leader